Elo is an unincorporated community located in the town of Utica, Winnebago County, Wisconsin, United States. Formerly known as Utica Center, the community was given its current name when the Elo post office was established in February, 1869.

Notes

Unincorporated communities in Winnebago County, Wisconsin
Unincorporated communities in Wisconsin